The 1999 World Badminton Grand Prix Finals was the 17th edition of the World Badminton Grand Prix Finals. It was held in Bandar Seri Begawan, Brunei from December 1 to December 5, 1999. The prize money was USD300,000.

Final results

References
Shuttlenews

World Grand Prix
World Badminton Grand Prix
International sports competitions hosted by Brunei
Badminton tournaments in Brunei
Bad